Chasm Provincial Park is a provincial park in British Columbia, Canada, located near the town of Clinton.

In addition to the park upland areas of ponderosa pine, marshes and lakes are included in the park's boundaries.

Wildlife 
Wildlife found in the park includes bighorn sheep, moose, mule deer, black bear, coyote, small mammals, songbirds and birds of prey.

Images

References

Provincial parks of British Columbia
Canyons and gorges of British Columbia
Geography of the Cariboo
Landforms of the Cariboo
Bonaparte Country
1940 establishments in British Columbia
Protected areas established in 1940